Gowrie House  was a building in the centre of Perth, Scotland, which existed in the 16th and 17th centuries. An earlier house on the site was standing in 1518, built or occupied by Elizabeth Gray, Countess of Huntly and the second wife of Alexander Gordon, 3rd Earl of Huntly. A document of 1552 mentions the great lodging that she had built in the Speygate of Perth. Latterly, the rebuilt and extended house was the home of George Hay, 1st Earl of Kinnoull (1570–1634), amongst others.

Gowrie House formerly stood on what became Tay Street, its location now occupied by Perth Sheriff Court, County Buildings and 46–52 Tay Street. The building extended from Water Vennel to Canal Street, bounded on the west by Speygate and on the east by the River Tay. Its entrance was an arched gateway on South Street.

In 1527, the building was purchased by William Ruthven, 1st Lord Ruthven, around a year before his death, from Elizabeth Ruthven, dowager Countess of Erroll. The building's appearance at this time is acknowledged with a bronze panel, by Sir John Steell, on the south wall of the present building.

Gowrie House was so-named for the title Earl of Gowrie, given to William, Lord Ruthven, in 1581. The Ruthvens were frequently Provosts of Perth. A workman, Archibald Wylie, was killed by a fall of stone masonry during building work on the house on 5 May 1579.

The house was central to the Gowrie conspiracy, a series of events unfolding on 5 August 1600, in which John Ruthven, 3rd Earl of Gowrie (1577–1600), and his brother, Alexander (1580–1600), were attempting to kill or kidnap King James VI of Scotland for unknown purposes. The king's retinue killed both brothers during the attack, and the king survived.

James VI ordered that the building be defaced by removing some of its corner turrets. In 1602, he gifted the building to the city, though he was careful to exclude its name when making the gift. In 1746, the city gifted the house to Prince William, Duke of Cumberland, in recognition of his victory at the Battle of Culloden. It is believed the duke later passed the house to his nephew, Admiral Watson, who sold it to the UK government for £2,000. It was converted into artillery barracks, and was occupied until the French Revolution. Several plans of the house were made during these years and are kept by the National Library of Scotland. In 1805, it was traded back from the government by the city in exchange for a site on which to build a depot for prisoners of war. Five acres of Moncreiffe land were given over.

During demolition in 1807 observers considered that the east and southern wings were older, with noticeably thicker walls, and were probably originally built for Elizabeth Gray. The west and northern buildings were built by the Ruthvens. The workmen were said to have found concealed vaults and closets in the old walls, one with an earthenware urn of bones. There was also a tower or garden building near the River Tay, known as the Monk's Tower, and intended to serve as a summer house or banqueting room. The 17th-century painted ceiling of the Monk's Tower included the symbols of the zodiac and heraldry of Hay of Kinnoull. The summer house was used for meetings by Charles II in 1650, and he may have stayed in Gowrie House. A detailed household account covering Charles' months in Perth reveals that the king had a boat or barge on the Tay, and was allowed more sugar in his pies than his courtiers, but does not mention that the 'King's house' where he resided in Perth was Gowrie House. The older parts of Gowrie House and the Monk's Tower before demolition were indicated on plans published by David Peacock.

In documentation from 1911, a Gowrie Rest House, Labour Yard and Lodging Home for Men and Boys stood on Speygate.

See also
Spey Tower

References

External links
 Drawings of Gowrie House from the Hutton Collection, National Library of Scotland
 Painting of Gowrie House, Perth & Kinross Council, Art UK

16th-century establishments in Scotland
Buildings and structures in Perth, Scotland